Swami Shivananda Educational Society is a school located in Malleswaram, Bangalore, India.  It has classes from Kindergarten all the way to tenth grade and follows the SSLC mode of education.

References

Timings
This school has been closed from July 14, 2020, due to the Coronavirus pandemic. The timings of the school previously were as following-
Monday:- 9:30 Am - 4:00 Pm
Tuesday:- 9:30 Am - 4:00 Pm
Wednesday:- 9:30 Am - 4:00 Pm
Thursday:- 9:30 Am - 4:00 Pm
Friday:- 9:30 Am - 4:00 Pm
Saturday:- 9:30 Am - 2:00 Pm
Sunday:- Closed.

Schools in Bangalore
Educational institutions in India with year of establishment missing